Common names: Andean lancehead.

Bothrocophias andianus is a venomous pit viper species endemic to the Andes in South America. No subspecies are currently recognized.

Description

The scalation includes 21-25 (usually 21-23) rows of dorsal scales at midbody, 157-174/169-179 ventral scales in males/females and 52-63/49-58 mostly divided subcaudal scales. On the head, the rostral scale is usually a little higher (up to 50%) than it is wide, the loreal scale is rectangular and wider than it is high, there are 3-10 keeled intersupraoculars, 7 supralabial scales with the second usually fused with the prelacunal to form a lacunolabial, and 8-11 sublabial scales.

The color pattern consists of an olive gray to brown ground color, which is occasionally darker anteriorly, overlaid with a series of 18-25 dark dorsolateral blotches that usually oppose middorsally, but may alternate. These markings are triangular, or in the shape of a headphone, and have black edges followed by a peripheral pale border. The belly is cream to yellow with heavy dark gray, brown or black mottling. On the head, the canthus and supralabials are a lighter than the overall ground color while the dorsum is darker. A well-defined postorbital stripe is present that is dark chocolate brown or black in color.

Geographic range
The type locality given is "Machu Picchu, Department of Cuzco, Peru, about 9,000-10,000 ft. altitude" (2,743-3,048 m).

References

Further reading
 Amaral, Afranio. 1923. "New Genera and Species of Snakes". Proceedings of the New England Zoölogical Club 8: 85-105. ("Bothrops andiana sp. nov.", pp. 103–105).

External links
 

andianus
Reptiles described in 1923